Grant Stoelwinder was head coach of the West Coast Swimming Club in Western Australia, working out of Challenge Stadium in Mount Claremont, Perth since 1997.  Mel Tantrum, Grant's assistant coach for many years, is now the new head coach of West Coast Swimming Club.

Grant was the head coach at SOPAC (Sydney Olympic Park Aquatic Centre) and now coaches at Sydney Uni. His own career as a successful swimmer and National Gold Medalist and later as a coach working under Lyn Mackenzie, a former Olympic swimmer herself, has given Grant the experience and skill to provide a carefully structured program to enable his swimmers for success.

Grant's team has had considerable success in Australian swimming, with many representatives on State and National teams, as well as four swimmers at the Athens Olympics in 2004.  This success has led to Grant being named WA Coach of the Year every year since 2004, and with his head coach, Mel Tantrum, he reached the first place club point score at the Australian Age Swimming Championships in 2007.

Grant is also coach for the current World's Fastest 50m and 100m swimmer, Eamon Sullivan.  With Grant's guidance and his specific high intensity program for sprints, Eamon has increased his success in the pool over the last year.  At the 2008 Australian Swimming Championships held at the Australian Olympic Park Aquatic Centre, Eamon broke the long-standing record of Alexander Popov for this swim twice, with a final time of 21.28 seconds.  According to Grant, this was a 'perfect swim'.  Eamon attributes his faster swim to a 'few words' from Grant.

Grant joined the procession of handshaking with the swimming luminaries during the highlights of Australian Olympic 2008 Beijing Swim Team on the final night of these selection trials with the team successfuls.

Following the Olympics, Stoelwinder moved to Sydney to become the head coach at the New South Wales Institute of Sport. He was joined by Sullivan and Libby Trickett, the world record holder in the 50 m and 100 m freestyle, who has moved from Brisbane. A few weeks later, 100m Butterfly 2008 Olympic Bronze Medalist Andrew Lauterstein joined the team.

References 
http://www.olympics.com.au/Athletes/EamonSullivan/tabid/271/Default.aspx?link=271&tabid=110&
https://web.archive.org/web/20080719064441/http://westcoast.asn.au/coaches.asp
http://www.abc.net.au/news/stories/2008/03/28/2202317.htm
http://www.abc.net.au/pm/content/2008/s2165932.htm
https://web.archive.org/web/20080722141005/http://www.wa.swimming.org.au/articles/article.asp?TopicID=33&ArticleID=3192
https://web.archive.org/web/20080721023005/http://www.wasa.asn.au/articles/article.asp?TopicID=1&ArticleID=2961
http://www.theage.com.au/news/swimming/sullivans-double-in-the-50/2008/03/28/1206207413871.html
https://web.archive.org/web/20080331134821/http://wwos.ninemsn.com.au/article.aspx?id=418470
Swimming Olympic Trials.(2008) National Television Broadcast, Channel Nine (Australia), 7.30 pm, 29 March.

Australian swimming coaches
Australian Olympic coaches
Living people
Year of birth missing (living people)
New South Wales Institute of Sport alumni
https://www.swimming.org.au/articles/vale-grant-stoelwinder